In public key infrastructure (PKI) systems, a certificate signing request (also CSR or certification request) is a message sent from an applicant to a certificate authority of the public key infrastructure in order to apply for a digital identity certificate. It usually contains the public key for which the certificate should be issued, identifying information (such as a domain name) and a proof of authenticity including integrity protection (e.g., a digital signature). The most common format for CSRs is the PKCS #10 specification; 
others include the more capable  CRMF
and the Signed Public Key and Challenge SPKAC format generated by some web browsers.

Procedure 

Before creating a CSR for an X.509 certificate, the applicant first generates a key pair, keeping the private key secret. The CSR contains information identifying the applicant (such as a distinguished name), the public key chosen by the applicant, and possibly further information. When using the PKCS #10 format, the request must be self-signed using the applicant's private key, which provides proof-of-possession of the private key but limits the use of this format to keys that can be used for signing. The CSR should be accompanied by a proof of origin (i.e., proof of identity of the applicant) that is required by the certificate authority, and the certificate authority may contact the applicant for further information.

Typical information required in a CSR (sample column from sample X.509 certificate). Note that there are often alternatives for the Distinguished Names (DN), the preferred value is listed.

If the request is successful, the certificate authority will send back an identity certificate that has been digitally signed using the private key of the certificate authority.

Structure of a PKCS #10 CSR 

A certification request in PKCS #10 format consists of three main parts: the certification request information, a signature algorithm identifier, and a digital signature on the certification request information.  The first part contains the significant information, including the public key.  The signature by the requester prevents an entity from requesting a bogus certificate of someone else's public key.  Thus the private key is needed to produce a PKCS #10 CSR, but it is not part of, the CSR.

CSR for personal ID certificates and signing certificates must have the email address of the ID holder or name of organisation in case of business ID.

The first part, ASN.1 type CertificationRequestInfo, consists of a version number (which is 0 for all known versions, 1.0, 1.5, and 1.7 of the specifications), the subject name, the public key (algorithm identifier + bit string), and a collection of attributes providing additional information about the subject of the certificate.  The attributes can contain required certificate extensions, a challenge-password to restrict revocations, as well as any additional information about the subject of the certificate, possibly including local or future types.

Example of a PKCS #10 CSR 

The PKCS#10 standard defines a binary format for encoding CSRs for use with X.509. It is expressed in ASN.1. Here is an example of how you can examine its ASN.1 structure using OpenSSL:

 openssl asn1parse -i -in your_request

A CSR may be represented as a Base64 encoded PKCS#10; an example of which is
given below:

The above certificate signing request's ASN.1 structure (as parsed by openssl) appears as the following, where the first number is the byte offset, d=depth, hl=header length of the current type, l=length of content:
    0:d=0  hl=4 l= 716 cons: SEQUENCE          
    4:d=1  hl=4 l= 436 cons:  SEQUENCE          
    8:d=2  hl=2 l=   1 prim:   INTEGER           :00
   11:d=2  hl=3 l= 134 cons:   SEQUENCE          
   14:d=3  hl=2 l=  11 cons:    SET               
   16:d=4  hl=2 l=   9 cons:     SEQUENCE          
   18:d=5  hl=2 l=   3 prim:      OBJECT            :countryName
   23:d=5  hl=2 l=   2 prim:      PRINTABLESTRING   :EN
   27:d=3  hl=2 l=  13 cons:    SET               
   29:d=4  hl=2 l=  11 cons:     SEQUENCE          
   31:d=5  hl=2 l=   3 prim:      OBJECT            :stateOrProvinceName
   36:d=5  hl=2 l=   4 prim:      UTF8STRING        :none
   42:d=3  hl=2 l=  13 cons:    SET               
   44:d=4  hl=2 l=  11 cons:     SEQUENCE          
   46:d=5  hl=2 l=   3 prim:      OBJECT            :localityName
   51:d=5  hl=2 l=   4 prim:      UTF8STRING        :none
   57:d=3  hl=2 l=  18 cons:    SET               
   59:d=4  hl=2 l=  16 cons:     SEQUENCE          
   61:d=5  hl=2 l=   3 prim:      OBJECT            :organizationName
   66:d=5  hl=2 l=   9 prim:      UTF8STRING        :Wikipedia
   77:d=3  hl=2 l=  13 cons:    SET               
   79:d=4  hl=2 l=  11 cons:     SEQUENCE          
   81:d=5  hl=2 l=   3 prim:      OBJECT            :organizationalUnitName
   86:d=5  hl=2 l=   4 prim:      UTF8STRING        :none
   92:d=3  hl=2 l=  24 cons:    SET               
   94:d=4  hl=2 l=  22 cons:     SEQUENCE          
   96:d=5  hl=2 l=   3 prim:      OBJECT            :commonName
  101:d=5  hl=2 l=  15 prim:      UTF8STRING        :*.wikipedia.org
  118:d=3  hl=2 l=  28 cons:    SET               
  120:d=4  hl=2 l=  26 cons:     SEQUENCE          
  122:d=5  hl=2 l=   9 prim:      OBJECT            :emailAddress
  133:d=5  hl=2 l=  13 prim:      IA5STRING         :none@none.com
  148:d=2  hl=4 l= 290 cons:   SEQUENCE          
  152:d=3  hl=2 l=  13 cons:    SEQUENCE          
  154:d=4  hl=2 l=   9 prim:     OBJECT            :rsaEncryption
  165:d=4  hl=2 l=   0 prim:     NULL              
  167:d=3  hl=4 l= 271 prim:    BIT STRING        
  442:d=2  hl=2 l=   0 cons:   cont [ 0 ]        
  444:d=1  hl=2 l=  13 cons:  SEQUENCE          
  446:d=2  hl=2 l=   9 prim:   OBJECT            :md5WithRSAEncryption
  457:d=2  hl=2 l=   0 prim:   NULL              
  459:d=1  hl=4 l= 257 prim:  BIT STRING        

This was generated by supplying the base64 encoding into the command openssl asn1parse -in your_request -inform PEM -i where PEM stands for Privacy-Enhanced Mail and describes the encoding of the ASN.1 Distinguished Encoding Rules in base64.

See also 
 SPKAC
 X.509

References

Cryptography standards